The Olcovich–Meyers House, at 214 W. King St. in Carson City, Nevada, is a historic, well-preserved house that was built during 1874–75 with Late Victorian architecture.  It was listed on the National Register of Historic Places in 1993.  The listing included two contributing buildings.

It is reportedly one of few surviving houses in Carson City that have "Gothic-influenced" architecture.  The house also shows Italianate and Eastlake stylistic elements.  It was built by Joseph
Olcovich for his brother Bernard.  Victorian details were probably added in the late 1880s, by George Meyers, who then owned it.

References

External links 
Olcovich–Meyers House, at National Park Service (with photos)

Houses on the National Register of Historic Places in Nevada
Victorian architecture in Nevada
Houses completed in 1874
National Register of Historic Places in Carson City, Nevada
Houses in Carson City, Nevada